Tom Phillips (June 29, 1956) is a Republican member of the Kansas House of Representatives, representing the 67th district.  His term began February 1, 2012 upon the resignation of his predecessor Susan Mosier.  Phillips was chosen by 21 of the 39 GOP precinct representatives in the 67th district on the condition that he would seek reelection in 2012.

Phillips was elected to a full term in the November 2012 general election, defeating Democrat Aaron Estabrook.

Phillips is owner of Phillips & Associates, a land surveying company that was established in 1992.  He had previous political experience as a city commissioner and mayor of Manhattan, Kansas.  He is originally from Fort Scott, Kansas.

Record
Phillips sponsored one bill and ten resolutions in the 2012 session.

Committee membership
Phillips serves on three legislative committees in 2012:
Aging and Long-term Care
Health and Human Services
Government Efficiency

References

External links
Kansas Legislature - Tom Phillips
Project Vote Smart profile

Republican Party members of the Kansas House of Representatives
Living people
Politicians from Manhattan, Kansas
American surveyors
Mayors of places in Kansas
21st-century American politicians
1956 births
Kansas State University alumni